7Up Thamizh Naattin Kural is a 2018 Tamil-language musical reality TV show. It is set to air on Colors Tamil. The show is about inviting entries from across the state, with a chance to be one of seven lucky voices to sing with A.R Rahman on stage.

References

External links
 7up Thamizh Naattin Kural Official website

Colors Tamil original programming
Tamil-language singing talent shows
Tamil-language reality television series
2010s Tamil-language television series
2018 Tamil-language television series debuts
Tamil-language game shows
Tamil-language television shows